Mpu Prapanca wrote the  Nagarakretagama, written in Old Javanese, which tells the story of the Majapahit Kingdom and other stories of ancient  Hindu-Javanese kingdoms. The Buddhist monk Prapanca wrote the chronicle in 1365 (or 1287 Saka year) as a eulogy to Hayam Wuruk, who brought Majapahit to its peak.

References

Indonesian writers
Indonesian Buddhist monks
Majapahit
14th-century writers
Year of birth unknown
Year of death unknown
Indonesian Buddhists